

CONMEBOL and CONCACAF

Rest of the world

References 

Broadcasting rights